Donald J. McKillip (September 6, 1924 – February 22, 2008) was an American football coach and college athletics administrator.  McKillip was the 11th head football coach at Adams State College—now known as Adams State University—in Alamosa, Colorado and he held that position for six seasons, from 1963 to 1967 and again in 1969.  His coaching record at Adams State was 41–16.  He served as the athletic director at Saint Mary's College of California from 1970 to 1989.

References

1924 births
2008 deaths
Adams State Grizzlies football coaches
Saint Mary's Gaels athletic directors
High school basketball coaches in Nebraska
High school football coaches in Nebraska
Junior college football coaches in the United States
Sportspeople from Denver